Chamwino District is one of the seven districts of the Dodoma Region of Tanzania. It is bordered to the north by Chemba District, to the east by Manyara Region, Kongwa District and Mpwapwa District, to the south by Iringa Region, and to the west by Singida Region, Bahi District and Dodoma District. Its administrative seat is the town of Chamwino.

According to the 2012 Tanzania National Census, the population of Chamwino District was 330,543.

Transport
Paved trunk road T3 from Morogoro to Dodoma and paved trunk road T5 from Dodoma to Iringa pass through the district.

The central railway of Tanzania passes through Chamwino District as well.
The new Standard Guage Railway passes through and there is a passenger station nearly completed in early 2023 at Igandu.

Administrative subdivisions
As of 2012, Chamwino District was administratively divided into 32 wards.

Wards

 Buigiri
 Chiboli
 Chilonwa
 Chinugulu
 Dabalo
 Fufu
 Handali
 Haneti
 Huzi
 Idifu
 Igandu
 Ikowa
 Iringamvumi
 Itiso
 Loje
 Majeleko
 Makang'wa
 Manchali
 Manda
 Manzase
 Membe
 Mlowa Bwawani
 Mpwayungu
 Msamalo
 Msanga
 Muungano
 Mvumi Makulu
 Mvumi Mission
 Nghambaku
 Nhinhi
 Segala
 Zajilwa

Notable persons from Chamwino District
 John Malecela, 6th Tanzanian Prime Minister

References

External links
 Chamwino District – official website of Chamwino District

Districts of Dodoma Region